Alicia Marie Tirelli Walter (born 1 December 1985) is an American-born Puerto Rican retired footballer who has played as a forward. She has been a member of the Puerto Rico women's national team.

Early life
Tirelli was raised in Brandon, Florida. She was born to American parents. Her father is of Italian and Puerto Rican descent.

International career
Tirelli was eligible to play for Puerto Rico through her paternal grandmother, who was born in Río Grande. She capped for Las Boricuas at senior level during the 2010 CONCACAF Women's World Cup Qualifying qualification.

International goals
Scores and results list Puerto Rico's goal tally first.

References

1985 births
Living people
Women's association football forwards
Puerto Rican women's footballers
Puerto Rico women's international footballers
Puerto Rican people of Italian descent
American women's soccer players
Soccer players from Florida
Sportspeople from Hillsborough County, Florida
People from Brandon, Florida
American people of Italian descent
American sportspeople of Puerto Rican descent
Florida Atlantic Owls women's soccer players
USL W-League (1995–2015) players
Durant High School (Florida) alumni
21st-century American women